Rawlins Municipal Airport  (Harvey Field) is two miles (3 km) northeast of Rawlins, in Carbon County, Wyoming. The Rawlins Carbon County Airport Board owns it.

Facilities
In the year ending May 31, 2018 the airport had 3,770 aircraft operations, average 10 per day: 98% general aviation  and 2% military.

References

External links 

Airports in Wyoming
Buildings and structures in Carbon County, Wyoming
Transportation in Carbon County, Wyoming
Rawlins, Wyoming